Conotalis nigroradians is a moth in the family Crambidae. It was described by Paul Mabille in 1900. It is found on the Comoros and in the Democratic Republic of the Congo, Malawi and Tanzania.

References

Crambinae
Moths described in 1900